August William Farwick (September 22, 1902 – December 10, 1977) was an American football player and coach.  He served as the head football coach at the University of Arizona in 1932, compiling a record of 4–5.

Biography
August W. Farwick was born on September 22, 1902.

He graduated from the United States Military Academy at West Point in 1925.

He died in Elgin, Illinois on December 10, 1977.

Head coaching record

References

External links
 

1902 births
1977 deaths
American football guards
Arizona Wildcats football coaches
Army Black Knights football coaches
Army Black Knights football players
People from Delanco Township, New Jersey
Military personnel from New Jersey